is a Japanese curler from Kitami, Hokkaido. As a skip, she has won the Japanese national championship six times. Fujisawa skipped the bronze medal-winning Japanese team at the 2018 Winter Olympic Games and the silver medal-winning team at the 2022 Winter Olympics. She is currently the skip of the Loco Solare curling team.

Career
Fujisawa's junior career began with a championship at the 2008 Pacific Junior Curling Championships over China's Sun Yue. This qualified her and her Japanese team for the 2008 World Junior Curling Championships, where they finished seventh with a 3–6 record. Fujisawa defended her Pacific Junior title by winning the 2009 Pacific Junior Curling Championships defeating China's Liu Jinli in the final. At the 2009 World Junior Curling Championships, she skipped Japan to a last-place (10th) finish and a 2–7 record.

In 2011, Fujisawa played in her first non-junior international event, skipping for Japan at the 2011 Pacific-Asia Curling Championships. She placed fourth at the event, finishing with a 2–6 record. Fujisawa won her first World Curling Tour event in 2012 by winning the 2012 Shamrock Shotgun over the South Korean national team, skipped by Kim Eun-jung. Later that year, she skipped Japan to a silver medal at the 2012 Pacific-Asia Curling Championships. Later in the season, she skipped the Japanese women's team to a seventh-place finish at the 2013 World Women's Curling Championship. In September 2013, Fujisawa and her Karuizawa-based rink, who had won the last three straight national championships, participated in the national trials for the 2013 Olympic Qualification Event. They lost the best-of-seven final of the trials to Ayumi Ogasawara's Sapporo-based rink in six games, which eliminated their chances of competing at the 2014 Winter Olympic Games.

Fujisawa left the team and joined Mari Motohashi's rink as skip in May 2015, moving from Karuizawa back to Kitami, where she had grown up and played juniors until 2009. Half a year later, Fujisawa and her new team represented Japan at the 2015 Pacific-Asia Curling Championships, where she led Japan to its first gold medal since 2005 by winning the final match against South Korea's Kim Ji-sun. Later that season, Fujisawa, with third Chinami Yoshida, second Yumi Suzuki, lead Yurika Yoshida, and alternate Mari Motohashi also competed for Japan at the 2016 World Women's Curling Championship in Swift Current, Canada. In the round-robin stage of the event, they finished second with a 9–2 record and advanced to the playoffs. They lost the 1 vs. 2 game to Binia Feltscher from Switzerland and then rebounded with a semifinal win over Russia's Anna Sidorova to earn a berth into the gold medal match. There, the Swiss team defeated Fujisawa's rink again but secured silver, Japan's first-ever podium finish at a world championship.

Fujisawa skipped the Japanese rink at the 2016 Pacific-Asia Curling Championships. After posting a 6–1 round robin record, tied with China and South Korea, her team would lose to China's Wang Bingyu in the semifinal. This meant that she could not defend her silver medal at the World Championships, as she had to make it to the finals to qualify Japan for the 2017 Worlds.

Fujisawa began the 2017–18 season by winning the Hokkaido Bank Curling Classic. The team won the 2017 Japanese Olympic Curling Trials in September 2017, defeating the Chiaki Matsumura rink three games to one in a best-of-five series. The team then went on to win a silver medal at the 2017 Pacific-Asia Curling Championships. After finishing in third after the double round robin with a record of 6–4, they upset China in the semifinal before losing to Korea in the final. The following month, she won her second tour event of the season, the 2017 Karuizawa International Curling Championship.

Fujisawa skipped the Japanese team that won the 2018 Olympics women curling bronze medal.

Fujisawa again represented Japan at the 2018 Pacific-Asia Curling Championships. She led her team to an undefeated 6–0 record in the round robin but lost to the Koreans (skipped by Kim Min-ji in the final. The next month, she represented Japan in the second leg of the 2018–19 Curling World Cup in Omaha, United States, which her team would end up winning, this time defeating Kim and her South Korean rink in the final.

Team Fujisawa began the 2019–20 season at the 2019 Hokkaido Bank Curling Classic, where they lost in the final to Jiang Yilun. Next, they won the ADVICS Cup. They had two more playoff appearances at their next two events, the Booster Juice Shoot-Out and the 2019 Colonial Square Ladies Classic, where they had semifinal and quarterfinal finishes, respectively. Next, they had a semifinal finish at the 2019 Curlers Corner Autumn Gold Curling Classic. In Grand Slam play, they made the quarterfinals at the Masters and the semifinals of the Tour Challenge, National and Canadian Open. They had two more playoff appearances on tour at the Red Deer Curling Classic, where they lost in the quarterfinals, and the Karuizawa International, where they lost the final to Anna Sidorova. For the first time in four seasons, Team Fujisawa won the Japan Curling Championships, defeating Seina Nakajima in the final. The team was set to represent Japan at the 2020 World Women's Curling Championship before the event got cancelled due to the COVID-19 pandemic. The Japanese Championship would be their last event of the season as both the Players' Championship and the Champions Cup Grand Slam events were also cancelled due to the pandemic.

Team Fujisawa played in no World Curling Tour events during the abbreviated 2020–21 season as there were no events held in Japan or Asia. The team would compete in their national championship, held from February 7–14, 2021 in Wakkanai, Hokkaido, as the defending champions. After an unblemished 6–0 round robin record, the team defeated Team Sayaka Yoshimura of Hokkaido Bank to advance to the final where they would once again face Yoshimura. Down one in the tenth, Team Yoshimura scored two points to win the national championship 7–6 over Team Fujisawa. This meant that once again, the team would not get to represent Japan at the World Championships. Team Fujisawa ended their season at the 2021 Champions Cup and 2021 Players' Championship Grand Slam events, which were played in a "curling bubble" in Calgary, Alberta, with no spectators, to avoid the spread of the coronavirus. The team had quarterfinal finishes at both events, losing out to Rachel Homan at the Champions Cup and Anna Hasselborg at the Players'.

In their first event of the 2021–22 season, Team Fujisawa finished runner-up at the 2021 Hokkaido Bank Curling Classic. They then played in the 2021 Japanese Olympic Curling Trials, which were held in a best-of-five contest between the Fujisawa and Sayaka Yoshimura rinks. After losing the first two games, Team Fujisawa rattled off three straight victories to win the trials and earn the right to represent Japan at the 2021 Olympic Qualification Event. There, the team finished third in the round robin and then defeated South Korea to secure their spot in the 2022 Winter Olympics. At the Games, Fujisawa led her team of Chinami Yoshida, Yumi Suzuki, Yurika Yoshida and Kotomi Ishizaki to a 5–4 round robin record, enough to qualify as the fourth seeds in the playoff round. They then defeated the number one seeds in Switzerland's Silvana Tirinzoni to advance to the Olympic final, where they would face Great Britain's Eve Muirhead. The team could not keep their momentum going in the final, however, dropping the match 10–3, earning the silver medal. Elsewhere on tour for the season, Team Fujisawa lost in the final of the 2021 Curlers Corner Autumn Gold Curling Classic after a previously undefeated record. In November, they went undefeated to claim the Red Deer Curling Classic. In Grand Slam play, they only qualified in one of three events they played in, the 2022 Players' Championship, where they reached the quarterfinals. The team wrapped up their season at the 2022 Japan Curling Championships. There, they went 7–1 through the round robin and won the 1 vs. 2 page playoff game over Hokkaido Bank. They then defeated the Ikue Kitazawa's Chubu Electric Power team 7–3 in the final to claim the national title.

Mixed doubles
After the 2018 Olympics, Fujisawa was awarded a wild-card spot in the 2018 Japan Mixed Doubles Curling Championship with fellow Olympian Tsuyoshi Yamaguchi. Despite having never teamed together and having very little mixed doubles experience overall, Fujisawa and Yamaguchi went undefeated to win the championship and the right to represent Japan at the 2018 World Mixed Doubles Curling Championship, where they would finish fifth overall.

Fujisawa and Yamaguchi successfully defended their title in 2019, and represented Japan at the 2019 World Mixed Doubles Curling Championship. There, they made it to the quarterfinal, where they lost to Australia.

Personal life
Fujisawa graduated from Hokkaido Kitami Hokuto High School in Kitami City in 2010. From then to early 2015, residing in Nagano Prefecture, she was employed as a curler and office worker for Chubu Electric Power, which has owned a competitive women's curling team based in Karuizawa, Nagano since 2009. Since returning to Kitami, she has been an employee of one of the local companies sponsoring her present team. She is currently an insurance agent.

Grand Slam record
Fujisawa and her team became the first Asian team to win a Grand Slam event (excluding defunct Slams) at the 2023 Canadian Open. China's Wang Bingyu had won the 2010 Curlers Corner Autumn Gold Curling Classic, which was considered a Slam at the time.

Former events

Teams

Women's

Mixed doubles

References

External links

Team Loco Solare, Official site

Japanese female curlers
People from Kitami, Hokkaido
1991 births
Living people
Continental Cup of Curling participants
Asian Games medalists in curling
Curlers at the 2017 Asian Winter Games
Medalists at the 2017 Asian Winter Games
Asian Games bronze medalists for Japan
Curlers at the 2018 Winter Olympics
Olympic curlers of Japan
Olympic silver medalists for Japan
Olympic bronze medalists for Japan
Medalists at the 2018 Winter Olympics
Medalists at the 2022 Winter Olympics
Olympic medalists in curling
Pacific-Asian curling champions
Pan Continental curling champions
Curlers at the 2022 Winter Olympics
20th-century Japanese women
21st-century Japanese women